Lorenzo Williams may refer to:

Lorenzo Williams (basketball, born 1969), American NBA basketball player
Lorenzo Williams (basketball, born 1984) American basketball player
Lorenzo Williams (American football) (born 1984), American football defensive tackle
Hosea Lorenzo Williams (1926–2000), American civil rights activist